Leónidas Lamborghini (1927–2009) was an Argentine writer and poet.

Poetry
Sorry Saboteur, The Yellow Peril, 1955.
The public poetry editions Buenos Aires. World Sentiment collection, No. 12, 1957.
The public dialogues 1 and 2. New book editions, 1960.
The legs on the sources, Outlook, 1965 and 1966. Sudestada, 1968.
The Statue of Liberty, Alba Editions, 1967.
Songs of Che, ARP, 1967.
The song of Buenos Aires, Responsa for locals, Tango-Blues, City Editions, 1968.
Called from Vietnam, 1968.
The applicant unseated, Editions de la Flor, 1971. Mainland Publishing Books, 1989.
Partitas, Corregidor editions, 1972. Selection Bicentennial Collection, National Library, 2008,  .
The riseñor, Marano-Barramedi editions, 1975. Reprinted by Argentine and hnos Publishers., 2012.
Episodes, Wasteland editions, 1980. Library computer version Scribd and Google Site, Free Books, Raul Nunez editor Berea, Mexico City, 2009.
Circus (Mexico 1977–1983), mainland editions Books, 1986.
Verme and 11 rewrites Discépolo (Mexico), South American, 1988,  .
Confined Odysseus (Mexico-Buenos Aires 1989–1991), engraved with Blas Castagna, Van Riel Editions, 1992, . Paperback, Adriana Hidalgo publisher, 2005,  .
Tragedies and travesties I (Mexico 1977–1990), mainland editions Books, 1994,  .
Comedieta (of globalization and art Jester), Estanislao editions, 1995. Selection, Heloise Cartonera, 2003 and 2010.
Rewrites, edits the Dock, 1996, 
Peron in Caracas, Folios editions, 1999.
The garden of the poets (Mexico 1977–1990), Adriana Hidalgo publisher, 1999, 
Character in penthouse and other grotesques, Dock editions, 1999, 
Carrion latter form, Adriana Hidalgo publisher, 2001, .
Look to Domsaar, Paradiso Editions, 2003, 
Laughter rogue (or morals Jester), Paradiso Editions, 2004, 
Found in the trash, Paradiso Editions, 2006, 
The player, play, Adriana Hidalgo publisher, 2007, 
The applicant unseated poem in four times, Paradiso Editions, 2008, 
Following the rabbit, the rabbit Following, Paradiso Editions, 2010, 
Last days of Sexton and Blake, illustrated by Adriana Yoel, Paradiso Editions, 2011, 
The genius of our race, Leonidas Lamborghini rewrites, edits Stanton, 2011,  . Reissue rewrites (Dock, 1996), includes a second version of the poems "The two banks" and "Eva Peron at the stake" + "Tuesday, November 18, 1947", translation of Antonin Artaud homonymous poem published in Supplement Spotlight diary page 12 16 May 1995 + "Two rewrites", two poems that rewrite two versions of "Night and Death" by José María Blanco White, published in Journal of Poetry, No. 57, Fall 1998.
The riseñor, Editors Argentine and brethren., 2012, . Reissue of The riseñor (Marano-Barramedi editions, 1975). Score includes "The riseñor" work for mixed choir a cappella Julio Martin Viera.

Biography 
Hernán Fontanet, New York, The Edwin Mellen Press, 2009..

Argentine male poets
1927 births
2009 deaths
20th-century Argentine poets
20th-century Argentine male writers